Thomas Charles Edwards (22 September 183722 March 1900) was a Welsh minister, writer and academic who was the first Principal of the University College of Wales, Aberystwyth.

Life
Thomas Charles Edwards was born at Llanycil, Bala, Merionethshire, on 22 September 1837. Edwards was the son of Lewis Edwards, founder of the Bala Theological College.
His mother was a granddaughter of Thomas Charles, the organiser of Welsh Calvinistic Methodism.

He was educated at his father's college in Bala, at St Alban Hall, Oxford and at Lincoln College, Oxford. At Oxford he was deeply influenced by Mark Pattison and Benjamin Jowett, and kept in touch with them for the rest of their lives.

He began preaching with the Presbyterian Church of Wales in 1856, and his resolve to become a minister was deepened by the revival of 1858–1859. In 1867 he became minister of the Windsor Street chapel in Liverpool, and later of the Catherine Street chapel in the same city. He was accounted one of the leading preachers of his generation.

In 1872 the new university at Aberystwyth was founded, and Edwards was appointed as the first principal. The college was opened with a staff of three professors and twenty-five students in October 1872, and for some years its career was chequered enough. Edwards, however, proved a skilful manager, and his hold on the affection of the Welsh people enabled him to raise the college to a high level of efficiency. When it was destroyed by fire in 1885 he collected £25,000 to rebuild it; the remainder of the necessary £40,000 being given by the government (£10,000) and by the people of Aberystwyth (£5,000).

Edwards resigned from the university post in 1891, partly for health reasons and partly to follow his father as head of the Bala Theological College.
He was also Moderator of the General Assembly of the Presbyterian Church in 1887.

He married Mary Roberts in 1876; they had four children.

He was weakened by a stroke in 1894, but continued to work until he died at Bala on 22 March 1900.

Publications
  Two editions in 1885. US publication of second edition: New York City: A. C. Armstrong & Son (1886)

 Nine editions up to 1904. Also published by:  New York City: A. C. Armstrong & Son, Toronto: Willard Tract Depository & Bible Depot

 (Davis Lecture)
 (About his father)

He also published individual sermons.

Statue at Aberystwyth University
A statue of Thomas Charles Edwards was unveiled in July 1922 in the forecourt of University College of Wales, Aberystwyth.  The sculptor was Goscombe John.

Awards
Honorary Doctor of Divinity, University of Edinburgh (1887)
Honorary Doctor of Divinity, University of Wales (1898)

References

Attribution:

External links
 
 

1837 births
1900 deaths
Alumni of Lincoln College, Oxford
Vice-Chancellors of Aberystwyth University
Welsh Presbyterian ministers
19th-century Presbyterian ministers
19th-century Welsh people